Deadly Record is a 1959 'B' feature British crime drama directed by Lawrence Huntington, and based on a novel by Nina Warner Hooke. It aired in the US as part of the Kraft Mystery Theatre. 
Plot:
When airline pilot Trevor Hamilton's wife is murdered, he is wrongly accused of the crime.

Cast
Lee Patterson as Trevor Hamilton
Barbara Shelley as Susan Webb
Jane Hylton as Ann Garfield
Peter Dyneley as Dr. Morrow
Geoffrey Keen as Supt. Ambrose
John Paul as Phil Gamage
Everley Gregg as Mrs. Mac
Edward Cast as Constable Ryder
George Pastell as Angelo
Ferdy Mayne as Ramon Casadas
April Olrich as Carmela
Percy Herbert as Belcher

Critical reception
DVD Beaver wrote "The film is better than most for this pleasurable genre of short Brit crime-thrillers. I will watch it again when the mood strikes."

References

External links
Deadly Record at BFI
Deadly Record at Letterbox DVD
Deadly Record at IMDb

1959 films
British crime drama films
British black-and-white films
1959 crime drama films
1950s English-language films
1950s British films